Must Be Nice may refer to:

Must Be Nice (album), by G-Eazy, 2012
"Must Be Nice" (song), by Lyfe Jennings, 2004
 "Must Be Nice", a song by Nickelback from Feed the Machine, 2017
 "Must Be Nice", a song by Ruel from 4th Wall, 2023